The First Succession Act of Henry VIII's reign was passed by the Parliament of England in March 1534. The Act was formally titled the Succession to the Crown Act 1533, or the Act of Succession 1533; it is often dated as 1534, as it was passed in that calendar year. However, the legal calendar in use at that time dated the beginning of the year as March 25, and so considered the Act as being in 1533.

Provisions
The Act made Elizabeth, daughter of Henry VIII by Anne Boleyn, who had been born on 7 September 1533, the heir presumptive to the Crown by declaring Mary, daughter of Henry VIII by Catherine of Aragon, a bastard. The Act also required all subjects, if commanded, to swear an oath to recognize this Act as well as the king's supremacy. Under the Treasons Act 1534 anyone who refused to take the oath was subject to a charge of treason.

The Act was later altered by the Second Succession Act, which made Elizabeth illegitimate, and the Third Succession Act, which returned both Mary and Elizabeth to the line of succession.

See also
 Succession to the British throne
 Alternative successions of the English and British crown

Bibliography
 Cannon, John Ashton. The Oxford Companion to British History. 1st ed. Oxford [England: Oxford UP, 1997. Print.
 Gardiner, Juliet, and Neil Wenborn. The Columbia Companion to British History. New York: Columbia UP, 1997. Print.
 Haigh, Christopher. English Reformations: Religion, Politics, and Society under the Tudors. 1st ed. Oxford: Clarendon, 1993. Print.
 Loades, David. Henry VIII Court, Church and Conflict. National Archives, 2007. Print.
 Ridley, Jasper Godwin. Henry VIII. New York, NY: Viking Penguin, 1985. Print.
 
 Viorst, Milton. The Great Documents of Western Civilization. Philadelphia: Chilton, 1965. Print.

External links
 Full text of the Act

1534 in law
1534 in England
Act of Succession
Succession to the Crown Act 1533
Succession acts
Mary I of England